Kampos is a community on the island Tinos, Cyclades, Greece. The community consists of the settlements Kampos, Agios Romanos, Vourni, Smardaki, Loutra, Xinara, Fsinos and Tarampados. Its population was 222 at the 2011 census.

References

Tinos